The Latin Grammy Award for Best Male Pop Vocal Album was an honor presented annually at the Latin Grammy Awards from 2001 to 2011. The award was given to a male performer for albums containing at least 51% of new recordings of the pop genre. Since its inception, the award category has had several name changes. In 2000 it was presented as Best Male Pop Vocal Performance. The following year onwards the award is known as Best Male Pop Vocal Album.

Spanish artists have won the award more times than any other nationality, though award-winning albums have also been performed by musicians originating from Argentina, Colombia, Guatemala, Mexico, Puerto Rico and Venezuela. The award for Best Male Pop Vocal Performance was presented in 2000 to Mexican singer Luis Miguel for "Tu Mirada". No Es Lo Mismo and Paraíso Express, recorded by Alejandro Sanz, Adentro, performed by Ricardo Arjona and La Vida... Es un Ratico by Juanes, received the award and also earned the Grammy Award for Best Latin Pop Album. Sanz is the most awarded singer in the category with three accolades, while performers Marc Anthony, Alejandro Lerner and Marco Antonio Solís share the record for most nominations without a win, with three each.

Recipients

2000s

2010s

 Each year is linked to the article about the Latin Grammy Awards held that year.

See also

Grammy Award for Best Male Pop Vocal Performance
Latin Grammy Award for Best Female Pop Vocal Album
Latin Grammy Award for Best Pop Vocal Album, Duo or Group
Latin Grammy Award for Best Contemporary Pop Vocal Album
Latin Grammy Award for Best Traditional Pop Vocal Album

References

General
  Note: User must select the "Pop Field" category as the genre under the search feature.

Specific

External links
Official website of the Latin Grammy Awards

 
Best Male Pop Vocal Album
Awards established in 2000
Awards disestablished in 2011
Male Pop Vocal Album
Male Pop Vocal Album